"The White Elephant" is the fifteenth episode of the third series of the 1960s cult British spy-fi television series The Avengers, starring Patrick Macnee and Honor Blackman. It was first broadcast by ABC on 4 January 1964. The episode was written by John Lucarotti.

Plot
Following the theft of Snowy, a rare albino elephant, Steed and Cathy are brought in to investigate illegal ivory smuggling.

Cast
 Patrick Macnee as John Steed
 Honor Blackman as Cathy Gale
 Godfrey Quigley as Noah Marshall 
 Edwin Richfield as Professor Thaddeus Lawrence 
 Scott Forbes as Lew Conniston 
 Bruno Barnabe as Fitch 
 Judy Parfitt as Brenda Paterson 
 Rowena Gregory as Madge Jordan 
 Toke Townley as Joseph Gourlay 
 Martin Friend as George

References

External links

Episode overview on The Avengers Forever! website

The Avengers (season 3) episodes
1964 British television episodes